Leslie Halasz Sabo Jr. (22 February 1948 – 10 May 1970) was a soldier in the United States Army during the Vietnam War. He received the highest military decoration, the Medal of Honor, for his actions during the Cambodian Campaign in 1970.

Born in Kufstein, Austria, Sabo's family immigrated to the United States when he was young and moved to Ellwood City, Pennsylvania. Sabo dropped out of college and was drafted into the U.S. Army in 1969, becoming a member of the 506th Infantry Regiment, 101st Airborne Division. On 10 May 1970 Sabo's unit was on an interdiction mission near Se San, Cambodia when they were ambushed from all sides by the Vietnam People's Army. Sabo repeatedly exposed himself to North Vietnamese fire, protecting other soldiers from a grenade blast and providing covering fire for American helicopters until he was killed.

Sabo was recommended for the Medal of Honor shortly after his death, but the records were lost. In 1999 a fellow Vietnam War veteran came across the records and began the process of reopening Sabo's recommendation. Following several delays, Sabo's widow received the Medal of Honor from President Barack Obama on 16 May 2012, 42 years after his death.

Biography

Early life 
Sabo was born in Kufstein, Austria on 22 February 1948 to Elizabeth and Leslie Sabo Sr., who had been members of an upper-class Hungarian family. Leslie Jr. had one brother, George, who was born in 1944, as well as a second brother who had been killed in World War II bombings at the age of one. With the post-World War II occupation of Hungary by the Soviet Union, Sabo's family lost their fortune in the war and, upon realizing Communism would be installed in Hungary long-term, they left the country permanently.

The Sabo family moved to the United States in 1950 just after Sabo turned two years old. Leslie Sr., who had previously worked as a lawyer, attended evening classes to become an engineer in the United States. The family moved to Youngstown, Ohio and lived there for a short time before moving to Ellwood City, Pennsylvania, as Leslie Sr. followed a job at Blaw-Knox Corp. Growing up, Sabo's father stressed discipline and patriotism. Sabo graduated from Lincoln High School in 1966 and briefly attended Youngstown State University before dropping out and working at a steel mill for a short time. He was described by friends and family as an affectionate and "kind-hearted hometown boy" who was easygoing and always in good humor. He enjoyed billiards and bowling.

Military career 

Sabo was drafted into the United States Army in April 1969 and sent to Fort Benning, Georgia for basic combat training. While on leave he married Rose Sabo-Brown (née Buccelli), the daughter of a World War II veteran and Silver Star Medal recipient, whom he had met in 1967. He attended advanced individual training in September and October of that year, followed by a honeymoon trip to New York City, New York. Sabo was assigned to Bravo Company of the 3rd Battalion, 506th Infantry Regiment, U.S. 101st Airborne Division and was known to enjoy his time in the military, preferring the environment of discipline and camaraderie.

In January 1970 Sabo and his unit departed for Vietnam to fight in the Vietnam War and he began corresponding with his wife regularly via letter. The unit came into contact with North Vietnamese troops frequently for the first several months of its deployment, but most of these were small hit-and-run attacks. On 5 May 1970 Sabo's platoon was attached to the U.S. 4th Infantry Division for a secret mission into Cambodia and dropped into the country on a UH-1 Huey helicopter. They were to conduct a series of interdiction missions against the Ho Chi Minh Trail with the assistance of heavy air support. For five days they came into constant, heavy contact with North Vietnamese forces that were often of superior size.

Medal of Honor action

On 10 May 1970 Sabo's platoon was part of a force of two platoons from Bravo Company on a mission to Se San, Cambodia. They were to engage a force of North Vietnamese Army (NVA) troops that had used the area as a staging ground for the Tet Offensive and other attacks. There they were ambushed by a force of 150 NVA troops hidden in the jungle and the trees, which had caught the American force in the open and unprepared. This battle became known as the "Mother's Day ambush." Sabo, who was at the column's end, repeatedly repulsed efforts by the North Vietnamese to surround and overrun the Americans. As the battle continued, a North Vietnamese soldier threw a grenade near a wounded American soldier lying in the open. Sabo ran out from a small tree that had been providing him cover and draped himself over his wounded comrade as the grenade exploded. Then, after absorbing multiple wounds from the grenade blast, Sabo attacked the enemy trench, killing two soldiers with a grenade of his own, and helped his injured ally to the shelter of a nearby treeline. Later, with the Americans running out of ammunition, Sabo again exposed himself to retrieve rounds from Americans killed earlier in the day.

Sabo then began redistributing ammunition to other members of the platoon, including stripping ammunition from wounded and dead comrades. As night fell the North Vietnamese refocused their efforts from wiping out the American force to harassing the helicopters that were carrying more than two dozen wounded soldiers. As that was occurring, the remaining platoon from Bravo Company broke through the North Vietnamese lines and relieved the other two platoons while the first medical helicopter arrived and loaded two wounded soldiers under heavy fire. Sabo again stepped out into the open and provided covering fire for the helicopter until his ammunition was exhausted. He received several serious wounds under heavy fire by the North Vietnamese while trying to reload. Although mortally wounded, Sabo crawled forward toward the enemy emplacement, pulled the pin of a grenade, and threw it at the last possible second toward an enemy bunker. The resulting explosion silenced the enemy bunker at the cost of Sabo's life. In all, seven other members of the platoon were killed in this ambush and another 28 were wounded. The North Vietnamese forces lost 49.

Subsequent recognition

Although he was posthumously promoted to the rank of sergeant, the circumstances of Sabo's death remained unclear to his family for several decades thereafter. Officially the military reported Sabo had been killed by a sniper while guarding an ammunition cache somewhere in Vietnam. Shortly after the action Sabo's company commander, Captain Jim Waybright, recommended him for the Medal of Honor, but the accounts of Sabo's actions and citation were lost for several decades. This changed in 1999 when Alton Mabb, another Vietnam War veteran of the 101st Airborne Division and a columnist for the division association magazine, uncovered the documents while at the National Archives in College Park, Maryland. Mabb publicized Sabo's exploits in the magazine and also wrote U.S. Congresswoman Corrine Brown D.-FL, whom he asked to forward the recommendation. Brown lobbied the U.S. Department of Defense for Sabo to be recognized and, in 2006, Secretary of the Army Francis J. Harvey recommended that Sabo receive the Medal of Honor. Due to the delay in processing the citation, however, the award had to be approved by an act of Congress, so Brown attached it as a rider to a 2008 defense authorization bill. After continued delays in the process, however, Sabo's family contacted U.S. Congressman Jason Altmire D.-PA to push the award through the Defense Department. Secretary of the Army John McHugh recommended the Medal of Honor for Sabo in March 2010 and, on 16 April 2012, it was announced that Sabo's family would receive the medal from U.S. President Barack Obama at a White House ceremony, 42 years after the action. Sabo posthumously received the Medal of Honor at the White House 16 May 2012, which was accepted by his widow. Sabo is interred at Holy Redeemer Cemetery in North Sewickley Township, Pennsylvania and is honored at a memorial to B Company in Marietta, Ohio, the home of his former commanding officer. Company of Heroes, a book written by Ellwood City-based journalist Eric Poole about Sabo and his fellow soldiers in Bravo Company, was released in 2015 by Osprey Publishing.

Awards and decorations

In addition to the Medal of Honor Sabo also received several other honors as well as being posthumously promoted to the rank of sergeant. His other military decorations include the Purple Heart Medal, the Air Medal, the Army Commendation Medal, the Army Good Conduct Medal, the National Defense Service Medal, the Vietnam Service Medal with two campaign stars, the Vietnam Military Merit Medal, the Vietnam Gallantry Cross with Bronze Palm, and the Vietnam Campaign Medal. His unit awards include the Vietnam Gallantry Cross Unit Citation and the Vietnam Civil Actions Unit Citation.

Medal of Honor citation 
Sabo was the 249th person to be awarded the Medal of Honor for actions in the Vietnam War and the 3,458th awardee in the history of the medal.

See also

List of Medal of Honor recipients for the Vietnam War

References

External links
U.S. Army valor website for Leslie H. Sabo Jr.
Medal of Honor ceremony C-SPAN Video Library

1948 births
1970 deaths
People from Kufstein
United States Army Medal of Honor recipients
United States Army non-commissioned officers
People from Ellwood City, Pennsylvania
American military personnel killed in the Vietnam War
Austrian people of Hungarian descent
Burials in Pennsylvania
Foreign-born Medal of Honor recipients
Austrian emigrants to the United States
Recipients of the Air Medal
Deaths by hand grenade
Vietnam War recipients of the Medal of Honor
Hungarian-born Medal of Honor recipients
United States Army personnel of the Vietnam War